Elna "Camilla" Odhnoff, née Wilske (6 June 1928 – 16 July 2013) was a Swedish politician (Social Democrat). She served as Minister without portfolio responsible for Family, Youth and Immigration in 1967–1974. She served as the Governor of Blekinge County in 1974-1992 and was the first female governor in Sweden. She was born in Gamlestaden, Gothenburg.

Sources

External links
 Vem är vem, Projekt Runeberg

External links
 
 

1928 births
2013 deaths
Women government ministers of Sweden
Governors of Blekinge County
Women members of the Riksdag
Members of the Riksdag from the Social Democrats
20th-century Swedish women politicians
20th-century Swedish politicians
Women county governors of Sweden
Swedish Ministers for Gender Equality